Section 91 of the Constitution Act, 1867 is a provision in the Constitution of Canada that sets out the legislative powers of the federal Parliament.  The federal powers in section 91 are balanced by the list of provincial legislative powers set out in section 92 of the Constitution Act, 1867.  The dynamic tension between these two sets of legislative authority is generally known as the "division of powers".  The interplay between the two lists of powers have been the source of much constitutional litigation since the Confederation of Canada in 1867.

The Constitution Act, 1867 is the constitutional statute which established Canada.  Originally named the British North America Act, 1867, the Act continues to be the foundational statute for the Constitution of Canada, although it has been amended many times since 1867.  It is now recognised as part of the supreme law of Canada.

Constitution Act, 1867

The Constitution Act, 1867 is part of the Constitution of Canada and thus part of the supreme law of Canada.  It was the product of extensive negotiations by the governments of the British North American provinces in the 1860s. The Act sets out the constitutional framework of Canada, including the structure of the federal government and the powers of the federal government and the provinces.  Originally enacted in 1867 by the British Parliament under the name the British North America Act, 1867, in 1982 the Act was brought under full Canadian control through the Patriation of the Constitution, and was re-named the Constitution Act, 1867.  Since Patriation the Act can only be amended in Canada, under the amending formula set out in the Constitution Act, 1982.

Text of section 91

Section 91 reads:
{{Cquote|Legislative Authority of Parliament of Canada
91. It shall be lawful for the Queen, by and with the Advice and Consent of the Senate and House of Commons, to make Laws for the Peace, Order, and good Government of Canada, in relation to all Matters not coming within the Classes. of Subjects by this Act assigned exclusively to the Legislatures of the Provinces; and for greater Certainty, but not so as to restrict the Generality of the foregoing Terms of this Section, it is hereby declared that (notwithstanding anything in this Act) the exclusive Legislative Authority of the Parliament of Canada extends to all Matters coming within the Classes of Subjects next hereinafter enumerated; that is to say,—
{{Cquote|1. Repealed.
1A. The Public Debt and Property.2. The Regulation of Trade and Commerce.
2A. Unemployment insurance.3. The raising of Money by any Mode or System of Taxation.
4. The borrowing of Money on the Public Credit.5. Postal Service.
6. The Census and Statistics.7. Militia, Military and Naval Service, and Defence.
8. The fixing of and providing for the Salaries and Allowances of Civil and other Officers of the Government of Canada.9. Beacons, Buoys, Lighthouses, and Sable Island.
10. Navigation and Shipping.11. Quarantine and the Establishment and Maintenance of Marine Hospitals.
12. Sea Coast and Inland Fisheries.13. Ferries between a Province and any British or Foreign Country or between Two Provinces.
14. Currency and Coinage.15. Banking, Incorporation of Banks, and the Issue of Paper Money.
16. Savings Banks.17. Weights and Measures.
18. Bills of Exchange and Promissory Notes.19. Interest.
20. Legal Tender.21. Bankruptcy and Insolvency.
22. Patents of Invention and Discovery.23. Copyrights.
24. Indians, and Lands reserved for the Indians.25. Naturalization and Aliens.
26. Marriage and Divorce.27. The Criminal Law, except the Constitution of Courts of Criminal Jurisdiction, but including the Procedure in Criminal Matters.
28. The Establishment, Maintenance, and Management of Penitentiaries.29. Such Classes of Subjects as are expressly excepted in the Enumeration of the Classes of Subjects by this Act assigned exclusively to the Legislatures of the Provinces.}}And any Matter coming within any of the Classes of Subjects enumerated in this Section shall not be deemed to come within the Class of Matters of a local or private Nature comprised in the Enumeration of the Classes of Subjects by this Act assigned exclusively to the Legislatures of the Provinces.}}

Section 91 is found in Part VI of the Constitution Act, 1867, dealing with the distribution of legislative powers.

Amendments
Section 91 has been amended three times since 1867.

When the Act was enacted in 1867, "The Public Debt and Property" was listed as section 91(1), and stayed in that position until 1949. In that year the British Parliament, on the request of the Canadian Senate and House of Commons, passed an amendment to the Act which re-numbered "The Public Debt and Property" as section 91(1A), and enacted a new version of section 91(1).  That new provision authorised the federal Parliament to enact certain limited types of constitutional amendments, relating to the internal structure of the federal government.Reference Re: Authority of Parliament in relation to the Upper House, [1980] 1 SCR 54.

That version of s. 91(1) was repealed in 1982 on the enactment of the Constitution Act, 1982, which contains a comprehensive amending formula.  Section 44 of that Act is the equivalent to the repealed version of s. 91(1), authorising limited amendments to the internal structure of the federal government.

Section 91 was also amended in 1940 by the addition of section 91(2A), "Unemployment insurance".  That provision was added by the British Parliament on the request of the Senate and House of Commons, after unanimous agreement from the provincial governments.  The amendment responded to the 1937 decision of the Judicial Committee of the Privy Council, the highest court for the British Empire, which had struck down an attempt by the federal government to pass unemployment insurance in response to the Great Depression.  The Judicial Committee ruled that unemployment insurance was a matter of exclusive provincial jurisdiction.  The new section 91(2A) instead assigned that jurisdiction to the federal Parliament.

Background and interpretation
The interplay between the list of federal powers in section 91, and the corresponding list of provincial powers in section 92, has been one of the most heavily litigated issues since Confederation in 1867.  The relationship between the federal and provincial powers is generally referred to as the "division of powers", meaning federalism issues, not separation of powers.

Both the federal powers and the provincial powers are stated to be exclusive, not concurrent.  A subject matter which falls within federal jurisdiction therefore does not come within provincial jurisdiction, and vice versa.  Canadian constitutional analysis uses the term ultra vires as shorthand for a matter that is outside the jurisdiction of a government, and intra vires for a matter that is within the jurisdiction of a government.  Related constitutional doctrines such as paramountcy and inter-jurisdictional immunity are also used to assess the constitutionality of a law under the division of powers.

Although some of the Fathers of Confederation, such as John A. Macdonald, favoured a strong central government, other Fathers of Confederation, such as Oliver Mowat, were more inclined to broader provincial powers.  Quebec has traditionally favoured stronger provincial powers.  In the late 19th century and early 20th century, the Judicial Committee of the Privy Council issued a series of decisions which expanded provincial powers at the expense of federal powers.

Additional sources of federal jurisdiction
Section 91 is not the only source of federal legislative authority, as there are other provisions of the Constitution Act, 1867 which confer legislative power on the federal Parliament:

 section 41 gives Parliament jurisdiction over the conduct of federal elections;

 section 91(29), when combined with the exceptions from provincial jurisdiction in section 92(10), gives Parliament jurisdiction over international and interprovincial works and undertakings, interprovincial and international shipping, and works declared by Parliament to be for the greater advantage of Canada;

 section 93(4) gives Parliament an exceptional jurisdiction to protect denominational and separate school rights;

 section 94 gives Parliament the power to legislate for uniform property and civil rights, if the provinces of Ontario, New Brunswick and Nova Scotia choose to transfer that jurisdiction to Parliament;

 section 94A gives Parliament the power to legislate on old age pensions and supplemental benefits, concurrent with provincial jurisdiction;

 section 95 gives Parliament the power to legislate with respect to agriculture and immigration, concurrent with provincial jurisdiction;

 section 101 gives Parliament the power to establish a "general court of appeal for Canada", as well as courts "for the better administration of the laws of Canada".

In addition, section 44 of the Constitution Act, 1982'' gives Parliament the power to legislate for the internal legislative and executive structure of the federal government.

References 

Constitution of Canada
Canadian Confederation
Federalism in Canada